Stewart McConnell is a former New Zealand international lawn bowler.

Bowls career
He won a bronze medal at the 1990 Commonwealth Games in the fours with Kevin Darling, Phil Skoglund and Peter Shaw.

He won three medals in the Asia Pacific Bowls Championships and also competed at the 1986 Commonwealth Games in Edinburgh, Scotland. He won 21 club titles.

Personal life
His brother Duncan also won 18 club titles.

References

Living people
New Zealand male bowls players
Commonwealth Games medallists in lawn bowls
Commonwealth Games bronze medallists for New Zealand
Year of birth missing (living people)
Bowls players at the 1990 Commonwealth Games
20th-century New Zealand people
Medallists at the 1990 Commonwealth Games